Hugo da Silva Alcântara (born 28 July 1979) is a Brazilian football manager and former player who played as a central defender. He is the current manager of Dom Bosco.

He spent most of his professional career in Portugal, amassing Primeira Liga totals of 138 games and four goals for Vitória Setúbal, Académica, Belenenses and União de Leiria. He also competed in Poland and Romania.

Football career
Born in Cuiabá, Mato Grosso, Alcântara played for several modest clubs in his country, almost all hailing from his native region. In 2000 he was part of Botafogo de Futebol e Regatas' roster, but played in no official games.

In the 2001–02 season, Alcântara moved to Portugal with Vitória de Setúbal, going on to appear in an average of 26 league matches in his four-year spell – 2003–04 was spent in the second division, with promotion – and helping the Sadinos win the 2005 domestic cup against S.L. Benfica (he played the full 90 minutes in the 2–1 final win); he spent 2005–06 with fellow Primeira Liga team Académica de Coimbra, only missing seven contests during the campaign for an eventual 13th-place finish.

After one season in Poland and another back in Portugal with C.F. Os Belenenses, where he was punished with a three-game ban for slapping Kostas Katsouranis of Benfica across the face, Alcântara joined a host of Portuguese (or Portugal-based) players at Romanian side CFR Cluj. He made his Liga I debut on 26 October 2008 in a 1–2 away loss against FC Politehnica Timișoara, and proceeded to be relatively used during his stint as they won five major titles, including the 2010 national championship with 22 appearances and three goals from the player.

In February 2011, Alcântara signed for J1 League club Montedio Yamagata. Before the season started, however, he left the club, in the aftermath of the earthquake in Japan. On 4 April, he joined Clube Atlético Paranaense.

After only a three-month spell, 32-year-old Alcântara returned to Portugal once again, signing with U.D. Leiria on 11 July 2011.

Honours
Vitória Setúbal
Portuguese Cup: 2004–05

CFR Cluj
Romanian League: 2009–10
Romanian Cup: 2008–09, 2009–10
Romanian Supercup: 2009, 2010

References

External links

1979 births
Living people
People from Cuiabá
Brazilian footballers
Association football defenders
Botafogo de Futebol e Regatas players
Club Athletico Paranaense players
Primeira Liga players
Liga Portugal 2 players
Vitória F.C. players
Associação Académica de Coimbra – O.A.F. players
C.F. Os Belenenses players
U.D. Leiria players
Ekstraklasa players
Legia Warsaw players
Liga I players
CFR Cluj players
Montedio Yamagata players
Brazilian expatriate footballers
Expatriate footballers in Portugal
Expatriate footballers in Poland
Expatriate footballers in Romania
Expatriate footballers in Japan
Brazilian expatriate sportspeople in Portugal
Brazilian expatriate sportspeople in Poland
Brazilian expatriate sportspeople in Romania
Brazilian expatriate sportspeople in Japan
Brazilian football managers
Cuiabá Esporte Clube managers
União Esporte Clube managers
CE Operário Várzea-Grandense managers
Sportspeople from Mato Grosso